Abington Park, in the Abington district of Northampton, has lakes, aviaries, and a museum, as well as trees and grassy open spaces.

Origins

The park contains the ruins of the former village of Abington, the site of a medieval manorhouse  with a mill attached, mentioned in the Domesday book in 1086. The Abington gallows used for the five hangings in 1612 following the Northamptonshire witch trials, amongst the first in England to use trial by ducking stool, are believed to have been situated at the crossroads in Abington Park. The village was enclosed and depopulated when the manor was enlarged and parklands created by the Thursby family in the late 17th century.

Abington Park Manor House
The museum was originally a manor house built at the turn of the 16th century. The Great Hall, now called the Oak Room because of its oak panelling, dates back to 1500. It was once home to William Shakespeare's granddaughter, Elizabeth Bernard née Elizabeth Hall, who was buried in 1670 in the adjacent late 12th-century church of St Peter and St Paul. Her second marriage was to Sir John Bernard or Barnard, the  MP for Huntingdon from 1660, who successively enlarged the house in the 1660s. It passed to the Thursby family in 1669 and was further enlarged and remodelled in the classical Georgian style between 1738 and 1743 by William Thursby. While owned by the Thursbys, the actor David Garrick planted a mulberry tree in the grounds in 1778, in recognition of his friendship with Anne Thursby. In 1821, during repairs to the church, all but the main tower of the church was blown down in a storm; the Thursbys rebuilt the main body of the church, which retains few of its original features.

In 1841 the manor was sold and its contents auctioned off. It was converted into a lunatic asylum in 1845, directed first by Thomas Octavius Prichard and later his cousin Thomas Prichard. The asylum was closed in 1892, when the Manor House and grounds were donated to Northampton Council. In 1994 the house was reopened as a museum after a complete restoration. The museum features displays about the social history of Northamptonshire (including a costume collection) and its military history (including artefacts from the Northamptonshire Regiment). The Museum of Leathercraft was also based in the house until 2016, when it moved to premises in the Grosvenor Shopping Centre in the centre of Northampton.

The Park

Abington Park has a bandstand which is suitable for hosting a selection of brass band, concert band, folk or jazz music. It was the venue for the annual 'Folk in the Park' festival until it moved to Delapré Park. The park also contains two lakes and a model boating lake, connected by a stream. The largest of the lakes was remodelled in the 1920s. There is also a play park, a cafe, tennis courts, outdoor table tennis, and a rose garden, as well as the church of St Peter and St Paul.

References

External links
Abington Park Museum
Museum of Leathercraft

Buildings and structures in Northampton
Tourist attractions in Northampton
Regimental museums in England
Fashion museums in the United Kingdom
Local museums in Northamptonshire
Museums established in 1899
1899 establishments in England
Parks and open spaces in Northamptonshire